Colias nebulosa  is a butterfly in the family Pieridae. It is found in the eastern Palearctic realm (Tibet and China).

Description
Colias nebulosa is much darker than Colias sifanica; the forewing without middle spot, but with light spot at the distal margin; the hindwing almost uniformly black, with large, conspicuous, light yellow middle spot, and light ray-like spots on the veins. We regard nebulosa as a distinct species.

Subspecies
C. n. nebulosa Sichuan
C. n. karoensis Hoshiai & Rose, 1998 S. Tibet
C. n. niveata Verity, [1909] Qinghai
C. n. pugo Evans, 1924 S. E.Tibet
C. n. richthofeni O. Bang-Haas, 1927 Richthofen Mts., Kukunor Mts
C. n. sungpani O. Bang-Haas, 1927 Sichuan, Gansu

Taxonomy
Accepted as a species by  Josef Grieshuber & Gerardo Lamas

References

External links
Colias nebulosa von J. Fuchs

nebulosa
Butterflies of Asia
Butterflies described in 1894